The 1914 United States Senate election in Maryland was held on November 2, 1914. Incumbent Democratic U.S. Senator John Walter Smith was re-elected to a second term in office over Republican Edward Carrington Jr.

This was the first regularly-scheduled election held in Maryland following the passage of the Seventeenth Amendment to the United States Constitution, which required direct election of Senators. However, a special election had been held in 1913 for Maryland's other Senate seat under the Amendment's requirement.

General election

Candidates
Edward C. Carrington Jr. (Republican)
Charles A. Develin (Socialist)
Richard Henry Holme (Prohibition)
V. Milton Reichard (Progressive)
Robert W. Stevens (Labor)
John Walter Smith, incumbent Senator since 1908 (Democratic)

Results

Results by county

See also
1914 United States Senate elections
1914 United States elections

References

Notes

1914
Maryland
United States Senate